Applied Psychology: Health and Well-Being is a triannual peer-reviewed academic journal published by Wiley-Blackwell on behalf of the International Association of Applied Psychology. It was established in 2009 and covers applied psychology topics such as clinical psychology, counseling, cross-cultural psychology, and environmental psychology.

According to the Journal Citation Reports, the journal has a 2018 impact factor of 1.946, ranking it 38th out of 82 journals in the category "Psychology, Applied".

See also 
 List of psychology journals

References

External links 
 

Wiley-Blackwell academic journals
English-language journals
Publications established in 2009
Applied psychology journals